Alexandra Mikhailovna Lukyanenko (1938-1993) was a Soviet-Ukrainian Politician (Communist).

She served as Minister of Social Security in 1979–1991.

References

1938 births
20th-century Ukrainian women politicians
Soviet women in politics
Ukrainian communists
Women government ministers of Ukraine
1993 deaths